Insult comedy is a comedy genre in which the act consists mainly of offensive insults, usually directed at the audience or other performers. Typical targets for insult include people in the show's audience, the town hosting the performance, or the subject of a roast. An insult comedian often maintains a competitive and interactive relationship with their audience. The style has been described as "festive abuse". The style can be distinguished from an act based on satire, or political humor. Insult comedy is often used to deflect or silence hecklers even when the rest of the show is not focused on it.

Notable performers 

 Fred Allen, especially towards his longtime friend Jack Benny
 Dave Attell
 Frankie Boyle
 Kevin Brennan
 Roy Chubby Brown
 Lenny Bruce
 Bill Burr
 George Carlin
 Jimmy Carr
 Dave Chappelle
 Louis C.K.
 Andrew Dice Clay
 Yucko the Clown
 Billy Crystal as his fictional character Buddy Young, Jr.
 Whitney Cummings
 Greg Davies
 Rodney Dangerfield
 Phyllis Diller
 Triumph the Insult Comic Dog
 Jeff Dunham's ventriloquist puppets Walter and Peanut
 Emmanuel Ejekwu (Mr Funny)
 Vinnie Favorito
 Redd Foxx
 Vice Ganda
 Brad Garrett
 Otto and George
 Ricky Gervais
 Greg Giraldo
 Jackie Gleason
 Tom Gleeson
 Alex Gonzaga
 Gilbert Gottfried
 Goundamani, especially towards his comedy partner Senthil
 Kathy Griffin
 Neil Hamburger
 Chelsea Handler
 Robin Harris
 Steve Harvey
 Bill Hicks
 Harry Hill
 Tony Hinchcliffe
 Bob Hope
 D. L. Hughley
 Jim Jefferies
 Anthony Jeselnik
 The Amazing Johnathan
 Andy Kaufman as his fictional character Tony Clifton
 Paul Kaye as his fictional character Dennis Pennis
 Jimmy Kimmel
 Sam Kinison
 Lisa Lampanelli
 Denis Leary
 Jack E. Leonard
 Bernie Mac
 Bill Maher
 Bernard Manning
 Marcus Valerius Martialis
 Groucho Marx
 Jackie Mason
 Hasan Minhaj
 Eddie Murphy
 Al Murray
 Trevor Noah
 Graham Norton
 Jim Norton
 Patrice O'Neal
 Russell Peters
 Richard Pryor
 Colin Quinn
 Don Rickles, widely considered a master of the genre
 Matt Rife
 Bianca Del Rio
 Joan Rivers
 Chris Rock
 James Rolfe
 Jeff Ross
 Jonathan Ross
 Rodney Rude
 Jerry Sadowitz
 Bob Saget
 Santhanam
 Kapil Sharma
 Sarah Silverman
 Ed the Sock
 Doug Stanhope
 Howard Stern
 Austen Tayshus
 Hans Teeuwen
 Judy Tenuta
 Daniel Tosh
 Dustin the Turkey
 Doug Walker
 Stefanie Wilder-Taylor
 Wendy Williams

See also 
 Roast (comedy)
 The dozens

References 

Comedy genres
Roast (comedy)
Stand-up comedy